Moon Township is a township along the Ohio River in Allegheny County, Pennsylvania. The population was 27,261 at the 2020 census.

History

18th century
The initial settlement of Moon Township was a direct result of the westward expansion of English settlers and traders who arrived in the Ohio Valley in the early to mid-18th century.  During the French and Indian War (Seven Years' War), the Iroquois, who controlled the land for hunting grounds through right of conquest, ceded large parcels of southwestern Pennsylvania lands through treaty or abandonment to settlers. In some cases, the land was already occupied by squatters who were to be forced off the land.

In the face of this turmoil, Native American settlements of the south bank of the Ohio River typically relocated to more populous areas of the north bank in the current locales of Sewickley and Ambridge.

On the southern banks of the Ohio River, political disputes among settlers clouded the disposition of lands. Generally, the Pennsylvania Land Office apportioned land to owners through grants. But, some of the land encompassing what is now the Coraopolis Heights, Thorn Run valley, and Narrows Run valley were claimed through the process of "Tomahawk Improvements", a non-specific and oftentimes contested method.  Settlement processes were often convoluted because of differences among land policies of the several colonies claiming the land, specifically Pennsylvania and Virginia.

Each colony had its own means of either granting or restricting settlement opportunities. Each settler claiming land in what is now Moon Township had to go through a multi-level process of application for grant, warrant of property, and survey to ensure the physical boundaries of the property, and patent approval whereby the applicant paid for the land and title was conferred.

In 1773, the settler John Meek was awarded a  land grant from Virginia above the river bottom and between the Thorn Run and Montour Run valleys, and "Moon Township" was born, although formal, legal recognition would have to wait until 1788.

Loudon's tract was situated on the Coraopolis Heights adjacent to the Meek grant. Vail's grant was established between the current Thorn Run and Narrows Run valleys (although the exact location is open to some interpretation).

Three other early grants were warranted by either Virginia or Pennsylvania land speculators. The boundaries of these land tracts are hard to identify, and the names of the original grantees are contested. Given that the history is somewhat hazy, it remains that in abandoning their lands, the unidentified squatters ceded any potential claims to settlers who would otherwise improve and/or cultivate the land.

As the 18th century drew to a close, abandoned lands were taken up by new settlers who were drawn to the region by the fertility of the soil. This round of pioneers were, by and large, wealthier than their predecessors and had the means to develop the broken and hilly areas into plots suitable for farming.

Moon Township was created in 1788 as one of the original townships of the newly created Allegheny County. In 1789 by an act of the legislature a portion of Washington County south of the Ohio River was transferred to Allegheny County. The transferred area became part of Moon Township.

At this time Moon Township occupied an enormous tract of land, possibly . Some reports and, more often, legends of the time indicate that it would take one man on horseback two days to travel between the boundaries of the township. The sheer difficulty of settlers performing their civic duties (e.g., reporting to assigned polling places or attending jury trials) made it necessary for local governing authorities to parcel out the land into smaller municipalities. So, in 1790, the current Fayette Township was portioned off from Moon Township, to be followed by Findlay and Crescent townships, respectively.

19th century
In 1800, when Beaver County was created from Allegheny and Washington Counties that portion of Beaver County south of the Ohio River that it received from Allegheny County was in Moon Township. Upon the creation of Beaver County that portion of Moon Township that Allegheny County lost to Beaver County was divided into two new townships: First Moon and Second Moon Townships, Beaver County.

20th century
In 1943, the federal government designed and built a housing plan known as Mooncrest for defense workers. Mooncrest residents produced armor plates, munitions and ships at the nearby Dravo Corp. during World War II. Operated by the U.S. Air Force after 1945, homes were sold to private investors in the mid-1950s.

Moon became home to Pittsburgh's modern-day airport in 1951, replacing the Allegheny County Airport as the main terminal for the region.  The area developed mainly due to the airport.  Prior to this time, the western hills of Allegheny County consisted largely of rolling farms and small residential developments. On April 1, 1956, TWA Flight 400 crashed on takeoff from the airport, killing 22 people just past the east end of the runway, which lies in Moon Township.

During the Cold War, Moon Township was the location of Nike Site PI-71, which was a battery of Nike Ajax and/or Nike Hercules surface-to-air missiles, used by US armed forces for high – and medium-altitude air defense.  The former missile site is now a nature preserve.

Development of Pennsylvania Route 60 (now Interstate 376) to the Pittsburgh airport, plus the addition of the Parkway West from Pittsburgh and nearby exits of Interstate 79, allowed Moon to become the area's crossroads for transportation via air and road.

In 1991, the relocation of the landside terminal of the Pittsburgh International Airport to nearby Findlay Township resulted in a loss in traffic to the township.  Moon experienced a significant loss of tax revenues but has since rebounded as the cargo area for the airport.

A large part of the airport's runways and facilities are located within the boundary of Moon Township, although the terminal and about half of the airport's land area are in Findlay Township, to the west.

The township is home to the Air Force Reserve 911th Airlift Wing, which was established in 1943.  Moon is also home to the 171st Air Refueling Wing of the Pa. Air National Guard. Additionally, the Army has its 99th Regional Readiness Command, built in the late 1990s in Moon Township.

Since the loss of the airport terminal, the township has shifted its focus from airport commerce to corporate development, residences and university hub. The main campus of Robert Morris University is also located within the township.

Major corporation headquarters like Nova Chemicals, FedEx Ground, and First Health/Coventry are located in Moon.

Moon Township is the location of the National Weather Service forecast office that serves Pittsburgh.

Economy
Growth is expected to continue in Moon in the near future due to many new construction projects such as the redevelopment of University Boulevard and conversion of the West Hills Shopping Center into a new shopping plaza.

Ground was broken in late 2006 on the new Cherrington Parkway extension. The extension, which opened in early 2008, created additional shovel-ready land for Class A office space, for corporate development.

As a result of Robert Morris University, the college feeds much of the economy along the township's University Boulevard area.

US Airways development
US Airways was born in Pittsburgh in 1939 as All-American Aviation, an airmail service that was the brainchild of the duPont family, and helmed by brothers Richard and Alexis Felix duPont – with the supervision of CEO Steven Gardner. Once passenger airline service became the vogue, the duPonts decided to haul people instead of boxes and letters and, in 1953, Allegheny Airlines was born.

Allegheny Airlines was one of the fastest growing airlines between the late '50s and '70s. During that time, Allegheny Airlines had absorbed two regional airlines, Lake Central and Mowhawk. This sudden growth was a burden on the airline employees, who often had to make creative rather than operational decisions when encountering a traveler. Hence, Allegheny Airlines was colloquially called "Agony Airlines."

In 1978, the Airline Deregulation Act was passed. The next year Allegheny Airlines renamed itself USAir.

During the 1980s, USAir went on a shopping spree. Within two years, they had bought up both Piedmont and Pacific Southwest Airlines, bringing their total number of flights to about 5,000 daily.

In 1987, with major subsidies from both Allegheny County and the State of Pennsylvania, USAir commanded the building of a 1.2 billion dollar expansion (rebuilding) of Pittsburgh International Airport. Where, it was said, USAir would retain a commanding presence and an airline hub for at least 45 years.

Even before their custom-made airport was finished, USAir became US Airways and promised that the hub status of PIT airport would remain in place.

After years of declining its operations in Moon Township, US Airways announced February 20, 2007, it would build its flight operations center on a piece of land adjacent to the Pittsburgh International Airport and Business Route 60 (now Interstate 376 Business). The center would retain 450 high paying jobs and increase it by 150 for a total of 600 jobs. The facility was closed following the 2015 merger of US Airways and American Airlines, and replaced by a different facility in Fort Worth, Texas.

West Hills Shopping Center
The West Hills Shopping Center, once the heart of Moon's commercial business, was sold to Wal-Mart for $4.7 million and announced to the public on January 3, 2007.

Wal-Mart officials announced their plans to build a supercenter location on the site of what was the West Hills Shopping Center.  The company also purchased two adjacent parcels of land along Brodhead Road.  Preparation of the site began in the second half of 2015.  The store opened in fall of 2016.

University Boulevard
On the morning of August 14, 2003, the former Beers School and Narrows Run Roads (from the I-376 Business Loop route to Thorn Run Road) became known as University Boulevard, a move that helped to promote the township as the home of Robert Morris University.

The new road name also depicts the township's efforts to re-emerge as a business-dominant community.  Since the 2003 renaming, township officials have researched various zoning ordinances to piece together Moon's main business corridor.

Explore Our Universe
Playing off the township's unique name, supervisors in 2005 gave Moon a new slogan, "Explore Our Universe".  "The slogan is a play not only on the township's lunar name but also on Robert Morris University and the University Boulevard business corridor, which township officials would like investors and consumers to explore a little more thoroughly," wrote the Pittsburgh Post-Gazette in 2005.

Moon Park renovations
Moon Park, the township's largest community park, was to begin a $10 million renovation in the spring of 2008.

Geography and climate 

Surrounding and adjacent communities
Moon Township has six land borders, including Crescent Township to the north-northwest, Hopewell Township (Beaver County) to the northwest, Findlay Township to the west and southwest, North Fayette Township to the south, Robinson Township to the southeast, east and northeast, and the borough of Coraopolis to the north-northeast.  Across the Ohio River to the northwest, a section of Moon runs adjacent with (from north to south) Edgeworth, Sewickley, and Glen Osborne.  The Sewickley Bridge is the direct link between Moon Township and Sewickley.

Demographics 

As of the 2000 census, there were 22,290 people, 8,445 households, and 5,767 families residing in the township.  The population density was 939.1 people per square mile (362.5/km).  There were 9,200 housing units at an average density of 387.6/sq mi (149.6/km).  The racial makeup of the township was 93.17% White, 3.58% African American, 0.06% Native American, 1.94% Asian, 0.02% Pacific Islander, 0.25% from other races, and 0.97% from two or more races. Hispanic or Latino of any race were 0.99% of the population.

There were 8,445 households, out of which 31.2% had children under the age of 18 living with them, 58.9% were married couples living together, 7.1% had a female householder with no husband present, and 31.7% were non-families. Of all households, 26.8% were made up of individuals, and 6.7% had someone living alone who was 65 years of age or older.  The average household size was 2.44 and the average family size was 2.99.

In the township, the population was spread out, with 22.1% under the age of 18, 10.6% from 18 to 24, 29.9% from 25 to 44, 24.6% from 45 to 64, and 12.8% who were 65 years of age or older.  The median age was 38 years. For every 100 females, there were 97.3 males.  For every 100 females age 18 and over, there were 95.1 males.

The median income for a household in the township was $57,173, and the median income for a family was $68,256. Males had a median income of $48,444 versus $31,073 for females. The per capita income for the township was $26,457.  About 2.2% of families and 4.2% of the population were below the poverty line, including 3.6% of those under age 18 and 3.5% of those age 65 or over.

Education
Moon Township is home to the Moon Area School District, which consists of students from both Moon and Crescent townships. The school district enrolls approximately 3,900 students in their seven schools educating grades kindergarten through 12th grade.

Government and politics 

The township is policed by the Moon Township Police Department.

National recognition 
In 2007, Moon Township was honored with several honors as one of the country's best places to live. BusinessWeek.com ranked Moon one of five best affordable suburbs in the Northeast. The recognition includes the 15108 zip code covering Coraopolis borough, Kennedy and Moon townships.

Moon was nominated as a runner-up in the list of top Pittsburgh suburbs to raise a family in 2013.

Notable people 
Jodi Applegate, graduate of Moon Area High School, former NBC News anchor, currently employed at the Fox affiliate in New York City
Kurt Angle, NCAA champion wrestler, US Olympic gold-medal wrestler, World Wrestling Entertainment (WWE) and Total Nonstop Action Wrestling (TNA) professional wrestler; also formerly a sports anchor at WPGH-TV. 
Gust Avrakotos, CIA operative whose exploits in Afghanistan were depicted in the book and film Charlie Wilson's War
Jim Baechtold, second pick in 1952 NBA draft and Head Coach of Eastern Kentucky University basketball
Barry Bonds, resided in Moon while playing for the Pittsburgh Pirates
Plaxico Burress, resided in Moon while playing for the Pittsburgh Steelers
John Calipari, graduate of Moon Area High School, basketball coach
Lou Christie, graduate of Moon Area High School in 1961; singer, songwriter 
Willie Colon, Pittsburgh Steelers
Bob Davie, former Notre Dame football coach and current ESPN sportscaster, grew up in Moon
Ann B. Davis, actress, briefly lived in Moon in the 1990s
Joe DeNardo, long-time WTAE-TV personality that was mostly known for his work as a meteorologist and the phrase "Joe Said It Would"
Trai Essex, Pittsburgh Steelers
Sean Gilbert, Washington Redskins player
James Harrison, Pittsburgh Steelers
Cameron Johnson, Phoenix Suns
Ryan Malone, former Pittsburgh Penguin
Sarah Marince, singer
Rich Milot, graduate of Moon Area High School, a former American football linebacker who played his entire nine-year career with the Washington Redskins from 1979 to 1987 in the National Football League. He played college football at Penn State University.
T. Mark Mustio, Pennsylvania state representative
John Pippy, former Pennsylvania state senator
Katelyn Pippy, American actress
Ray Seals, resided in Moon while playing for the Pittsburgh Steelers
A. Q. Shipley, Center for the Arizona Cardinals, graduate of Moon Area High School
Brandon Wilson, graduate of Moon Area High School, author/explorer

Moon in the media 
 Scenes from the 1979 movie The Fish that Saved Pittsburgh were shot in the gym at Moon Area High School.
 The Los Angeles–based production company, Phalco Films, was established in Moon Township in early 2006 before relocating to the West Coast.
 Parts of the movie The Silence of the Lambs were filmed in Moon Township. Several Moon Township police officers had minor non-speaking roles as extras in the film.
 Parts of the movie Adventureland were filmed in Moon Township at the Stardust Lounge.

Presidential visits 
Because Pittsburgh International Airport is adjacent to Moon, many presidential visits to the Pittsburgh area start in Moon.  For example, President Gerald Ford made a surprise visit to Moon a day after pardoning President Richard M. Nixon on September 9, 1974.  In 1994, President Bill Clinton greeted Prime Minister John Major of Great Britain at a hangar at the 911th Air Wing of the Air Force Reserve at the Pittsburgh International Airport in Moon Township. A day after securing the Democratic nomination for president, then–Vice President Al Gore held a rally at Moon's high school gym on March 16, 2000. In September 2009, President Obama visited Pittsburgh for the G-20 conference. Then–Republican presidential nominee Donald Trump held a rally on June 11, 2016, at the Moon Township airplane hangar. On March 10, 2018, then-President Trump held another rally at the Moon Township airplane hangar, campaigning in support of Republican congressional candidate Rick Saccone for a special election within Pennsylvania's 18th congressional district.

References

External links 

 
 Moon Township Economic Development

 
Pennsylvania populated places on the Ohio River
Pittsburgh metropolitan area
Townships in Allegheny County, Pennsylvania
Townships in Pennsylvania